This is a list of Justices of the Supreme Court of the United Kingdom since its creation on 1 October 2009 upon the transfer to the Supreme Court of the United Kingdom of the judicial functions of the House of Lords.

The court comprises a President, a Deputy President and 10 (puisne) Justices, for a total of 12 judges, of which — by convention — nine are from England and Wales, two from Scotland, and one from Northern Ireland. At the court's creation, 10 judges were appointed from the House of Lords, and one was appointed directly to it. The remaining initial vacancy was filled by Lord Dyson six months later.

List of judges of the Supreme Court

See also
List of Lords of Appeal in Ordinary
Supreme Court of the United Kingdom
Constitutional Reform Act 2005
Courts of the United Kingdom

References

Lists of judges in the United Kingdom
 List
United Kingdom